Walter Sharp may refer to: 

Walter L. Sharp (born 1952), U.S. Army General
Walter Benona Sharp (1870–1912), American oilman
Walter Rice Sharp, American political scientist

See also
Walter Sharpe, American basketball player